James Duncan O'Brien (born June 9, 1983) is a professional surfer from the North Shore, Hawaii.

Career
Jamie grew up near one of the most notorious waves on the planet, with a home in front of the Banzai Pipeline, on the surfing Mecca of Oahu’s North Shore. He started competing in local surf contests when he was about six years old and carried on into his early 20s.

O'Brien has said that he was fortunate as a child to grow up near the Banzai Pipeline. He is one of the youngest surfers ever to win a Pipeline Masters.

Jamie's father, Australian Frank O'Brien, was a lifeguard. Jamie has said that one of the things that got him interested in surfing was talking to many of the regular surfers on his dad's beach.

Jamie has many achievements to his name. These achievements include the Pipeline Masters in 2001, in which he took 4th place after just recovering from a groin injury. His success continued with 1st place at Hansen's Pipeline Pro in 2003, 1st place in the 2004 Fosters Expression Trestles and the Rip Curl Pipeline Masters at 21 years of age, 1st in the 2009 Rip Curl Invitational, and 1st in the inaugural Volcom Pipe Pro back in 2010. Jamie also had many other outstanding performances throughout the WSL qualifying series and the championship tour.

O'Brien produced two surfing films, Freakshow and Freakside. He also appeared in Step into Liquid and Blue Crush. He is the star of the video series "Who is JOB," which ended with the final episode posted on Oct 18, 2019, for a total of 9 seasons on YouTube.

In 2005 O'Brien received Surfer Magazine's Boost Breakthrough Performer of the Year Award for an up-and-coming athlete with an impact on the sport for years to come.

In 2016 Jamie O'Brien assisted in the rescue of a bodyboarder who had wiped out and was drowning, by paddling out with a foam board to help Guilherme Tamega who was trying to bring the victim to shore.

Jamie is also the owner and founder of Jamie O'Brien Surf Experience, a North Shore surf school that gives surf lessons in conjunction with the Turtle Bay Resort.

References

External links
Red Bull's Profile on Jamie O'Brien
Nectar Sunglasses Advocates: Jamie O'Brien

1983 births
Living people
American surfers
Sportspeople from Hawaii
World Surf League surfers
American people of Irish descent